Shadi Lal Batra (born January 2, 1940 in village Machhiwal, District Jhang (Punjab, now in Pakistan)) is the politician from Indian National Congress Party. He was elected to Rajya Sabha from state of Haryana on the ticket of INC in April 2012.

He had studied Law and resides at Rohtak.

References

1940 births
Living people
Rajya Sabha members from Haryana
Indian National Congress politicians